is a Japanese amateur astronomer and discoverer of minor planets.

The Minor Planet Center credits him with the discovery of 45 numbered minor planets in collaboration with amateur astronomer Masaru Arai at Yorii Observatory during 1988–1991.

The main-belt asteroid 19190 Morihiroshi, discovered by Japanese astronomers Tsutomu Hioki and Shuji Hayakawa in 1992, was named in his honor. Naming citation was published on 6 January 2003.

List of discovered minor planets

See also

References

External links 
  Hiroshi Mori's list of asteroids found at Yorii Observatory

1958 births
Discoverers of asteroids
20th-century Japanese astronomers
Living people